The 2006 Ivy League Baseball Championship Series took place at Joseph J. O'Donnell Field in Cambridge, Massachusetts on May 6, 2006.  The series matched the regular season champions of each of the league's two divisions.  , the winner of the series, claimed their sixth title and the Ivy League's automatic berth in the 2006 NCAA Division I baseball tournament.  It was Princeton's fifth Championship Series victory in seven years and their tenth appearance in eleven seasons.

Harvard made their eighth appearance in the Championship Series, having won the title in 2005.

Results

References

Ivy League Baseball Championship Series
Tournament
Ivy League Baseball Championship Series